HMS Artful (P456), was an  of the Royal Navy, built by Scotts Shipbuilding and Engineering Company of Greenock and launched 22 May 1944.

In 1953 she took part in the Fleet Review to celebrate the Coronation of Queen Elizabeth II.  In 1955 she was the first of her class to be rebuilt and streamlined. In 1966 she completed a refit and recommissioned for service with the Home Fleet. In 1967 she undertook a Home Fleet Squadron tour to the West Indies and later that year attended Portsmouth Navy Days.

Design
Like all Amphion-class submarines, Artful had a displacement of  when at the surface and  while submerged. The submarine was powered by two Admiralty ML eight-cylinder diesel engines generating a power of  each. It also contained four electric motors each producing  that drove two shafts.

Artful was fitted with ten  torpedo tubes, one QF 4 inch naval gun Mk XXIII, one Oerlikon 20 mm cannon, and a .303 British Vickers machine gun. Its torpedo tubes were fitted to the bow and stern, and it could carry twenty torpedoes. Its complement was sixty-one crew members.

References
Peter Lindley 1963-1965  Lieutenant commander

Publications

External links
Pictures of HMS Artful at MaritimeQuest

 

Amphion-class submarines
Cold War submarines of the United Kingdom
Ships built by Scotts Shipbuilding and Engineering Company
1947 ships